Feeders is a 1996 American low-budget science fiction horror film written and directed by John and Mark Polonia. Shot on video on a $500 budget, it became semi-popular among cult film enthusiasts for its extremely amateurish direction, acting, writing and special effects.

The film spawned a Christmas-themed sequel, Feeders II: Slay Bells (1998), which was reviewed by Something Awful, who called it one of "Film's Best Worst Movies".

Synopsis
Two photographers travelling through Pennsylvania pick up a couple of women, then stumble across little grey aliens who land their flying saucer in the woods and start hunting and eating humans.

Cast
Jon McBride as Derek
John Polonia as Bennett
Todd Carpenter	as Fisherman
Sebastian Barran as Doctor
Melissa Torpy as Michelle
Gary LeBlanc as Ranger Gordon

Reception
Critical reception to the film was largely negative, receiving negative reviews from DVD Talk and Something Awful.

References

External links
 
 
 Mark Polonia responds to critics

1996 films
1996 horror films
American science fiction horror films
1990s science fiction horror films
Films directed by Mark Polonia
1990s English-language films
1990s American films